The Class of Miss MacMichael is a 1978 British comedy drama film directed by Silvio Narizzano, and starring Glenda Jackson, Oliver Reed, and Michael Murphy. It was based on a novel by Sandy Hutson.

Plot
The film depicts the attempts of an idealistic teacher, Miss MacMichael, to inspire her pupils in an inner-city London school. While trying to help the teens she works with, she also must fight the ultra authoritarian headmaster, Mr Sutton.

Cast
 Glenda Jackson as Conor MacMichael
 Oliver Reed as Terence Sutton
 Michael Murphy as Martin West
 Rosalind Cash as Una Ferrar
 John Standing as Charles Fairbrother
 Phil Daniels as Stewart
 Pamela Manson as Mrs. Bellrind

Production
Although the film was shot in Britain it was financed entirely from the United States which the director thought was "disgraceful".

Reception
Reviews of the film were mostly negative, dismissing the film as routine and predictable, and criticizing Oliver Reed's role and performance.

Janet Maslin in the New York Times wrote, "Brut productions, which once brought you Glenda Jackson in 'A Touch of Class,' this time presents her in circumstances that are decidedly déclassé...Miss Jackson does nothing here that she hasn't done better elsewhere." Variety criticized the film as, "Treading the usual characterizations and situations", but added, "Though predictable, and the script serviceable for this oft-treated theme, with direction average, it has Glenda Jackson adding her presence to the part of a dedicated teacher who eschews a second marriage to stay with her impossible charges." Time Out denounced the film, writing, "Reed, as the neo-fascist headmaster of a school for delinquents, parodies his boorish film persona to the point of farce, alternately strutting around like a boiled turkey or oiling his way with the school's visitors, while Jackson goes at her role of committed teacher/lone befriender of kids with jaw-forward heartiness. Add to this conflict in styles the film's confused intentions -- black comedy, the horrific realities of reform schools, a sentimental belief that understanding will overcome - and you have a mess."

References

External links

1978 films
1978 comedy-drama films
1970s English-language films
Films about educators
Films directed by Silvio Narizzano
Films scored by Stanley Myers
British comedy-drama films
1978 comedy films
1978 drama films
1970s British films